Payworld is an Indian financial service company based that provides services including money transfer, recharges, and bill payments. The company was founded in 2006 by the Sugal & Damani group and has its headquarters in Gurgaon, Haryana.

History
In 2006, Payworld started with electronic pre-paid voucher distribution for mobile phones in Madhya Pradesh, Uttar Pradesh and Gujarat. It is present in 23 states and 630 districts and 80000 villages across India.

Payworld started its business with telecom partnerships; it now has more than 100 partnerships across various sectors. The company's total transaction value in 2016-2017 was ₹1600 crores and ₹3800 crores in 2017-2018.

Payworld Money
Payworld Money is a mobile wallet approved by the RBI. Payworld claims 10 million users in 2017. This wallet processed more than 3.8 million transactions with a GTV of $130 million in 2016-2017.

Payworld is short-listed as GST Suvidha provider (GST Filing) by Goods and Services Tax Network (GSTN) in India along with other 33 GST Suvidha providers including TCS, Ernst, Deloitte, Mastek and more.

References

Financial services companies of India
Payment service providers
Mobile payments in India